334 may refer to:

The year 334
334 (number)
334 (novel)